The House at 32 Morrison Road in Wakefield, Massachusetts is a well-preserved, architecturally eclectic, house in the Wakefield Park section of town.  The -story wood-frame house features a gambrel roof with a cross gable gambrel section.  Set in the front gable end is a Palladian window arrangement.  The porch has a fieldstone apron, with Ionic columns supporting a pedimented roof.  Above the front entry rises a two-story turret with conical roof.  The house was built c. 1906–08, as part of the Wakefield Park subdivision begun in the 1880s by J.S. Merrill.

The house was listed on the National Register of Historic Places in 1989.

See also
National Register of Historic Places listings in Wakefield, Massachusetts
National Register of Historic Places listings in Middlesex County, Massachusetts

References

Houses on the National Register of Historic Places in Wakefield, Massachusetts
Colonial Revival architecture in Massachusetts
Houses completed in 1906
Houses in Wakefield, Massachusetts
1906 establishments in Massachusetts